Colorado State University (Colorado State or CSU) is a public land-grant research university in Fort Collins, Colorado. It is the flagship university of the Colorado State University System. Colorado State University is classified among "R1: Doctoral Universities – Very high research activity". It was founded in 1870 as Colorado Agricultural College and in 1935 was renamed the Colorado State College of Agriculture and Mechanic Arts. In 1957, the Colorado General Assembly approved its current name, Colorado State University.

In 2018, enrollment was approximately 34,166 students, including resident and non-resident instruction students. The university has approximately 2,000 faculty in eight colleges and 55 academic departments. Bachelor's degrees are offered in 65 fields of study, with master's degrees in 55 fields. Colorado State confers doctoral degrees in 40 fields of study, in addition to a professional degree in veterinary medicine. CSU's campus boasts the Engines and Energy Conversion Laboratory (EECL), the University Center for the Arts, which houses the Avenir Museum of Design and Merchandising and the Gregory Allicar Museum of Art, the James L. Voss Veterinary Teaching Hospital, and the Cooperative Institute for Research in the Atmosphere (CIRA).

In fiscal year 2018, CSU spent $375 million on research and development, ranking 65th in the nation overall and 39th when excluding medical school spending. CSU graduates include Pulitzer Prize winners, astronauts, CEOs, and two former governors of Colorado. In fiscal year 2021, CSU spent $447.2 million on research and development 

The Colorado State Rams compete in the NCAA Division I Mountain West conference. Swimmer and six-time Olympic gold medalist Amy Van Dyken is one of CSU's most notable athletes. The school renamed West Drive, which stretches along the west side of the Administration Building at the south end of CSU's Oval, Amy Van Dyken Way.

History

Early years
It was founded first as the Colorado Agricultural College. Arising from the Morrill Act of 1862, the act to create the university was signed by the Colorado Territory governor Edward M. McCook in 1870. While a board of 12 trustees was formed to "purchase and manage property, erect buildings, establish basic rules for governing the institutions and employ buildings," the near complete lack of funding by the territorial legislature for this mission severely hampered progress.

The first  parcel of land for the campus was deeded in 1871 by Robert Dazell. In 1872, the Larimer County Land Improvement Company contributed a second  parcel. The first $1000 to erect buildings was finally allocated by the territorial legislature in 1874. The funds were not, however, and trustees were required to find a matching amount, which they eventually obtained from local citizens and businesses.

Among the institutions which donated matching funds was the local Grange, which was heavily involved in the early establishment of the university. As part of this effort, in the spring of 1874 Grange No. 6 held a picnic and planting event at the corner of College Avenue and West Laurel Street, and later plowed and seeded 20 acres (80,000 m2) of wheat on a nearby field. Within several months, the university's first building, a -by-24-foot red brick building nicknamed the "Claim Shanty" was finished, providing the first tangible presence of the institution in Fort Collins.

After Colorado achieved statehood in 1876, the territorial law establishing the college was required to be reauthorized. In 1877, the state legislature created the eight-member State Board of Agriculture to govern the school. Early in the 21st century, the governing board was renamed the Board of Governors of the Colorado State University System. The legislature also authorized a railroad right-of-way across the campus and a mill levy to raise money for construction of the campus' first main building, Old Main, which was completed in December 1878. Despite wall cracks and other structural problems suffered during its first year, the building was opened in time for the welcoming of the first five students on September 1, 1879, by university president Elijah Evan Edwards.  Enrollment grew to 25 by 1880.

During the first term at Colorado Agricultural College in fall 1879, the school functioned more as a college-prep school than a college because of the lack of trained students. Consequently, the first course offerings were arithmetic, English, U.S. history, natural philosophy, horticulture and farm economy. Students also labored on the college farm and attended daily chapel services. The spring term provided the first true college-level instruction. Despite his accomplishments, Edwards resigned in spring 1882 because of conflicts with the State Board of Agriculture, a young faculty member, and with students. The board's next appointee as president was Charles Ingersoll, a graduate and former faculty member at Michigan State Agricultural College, who began his nine years of service at CAC with just two full-time faculty members and 67 students, 24 of whom were women.

President Charles Ingersoll
Agricultural research would grow rapidly under Ingersoll. The Hatch Act of 1887 provided federal funds to establish and maintain experiment stations at land-grant colleges. Ainsworth Blount, CAC's first professor of practical agriculture and manager of the College Farm, had become known as a "one man experiment station", and the Hatch Act expanded his original station to five Colorado locations. The curriculum expanded as well, introducing coursework in engineering, animal science, and liberal arts. New faculty members brought expertise in botany, horticulture, entomology, and irrigation engineering. CAC made its first attempts at animal science during 1883–84, when it hired veterinary surgeon George Faville. Faville conducted free weekly clinics for student instruction and treatment of local citizen's diseased or injured animals. Veterinary science at the college languished for many years following Faville's departure in 1886.

President Ingersoll believed the school neglected special programs for women. Despite the reluctance of the institution's governing board, CAC began opening the door to liberal arts in 1885, and by Ingersoll's last year at CAC the college had instituted a "Ladies Course" that offered junior and senior women classes in drawing, stenography and typewriting, foreign languages, landscape gardening and psychology. Ingersoll's belief in liberal yet practical education conflicted with the narrower focus of the State Board of Agriculture, and a final clash in April 1891 led to his resignation. In 1884, CAC would celebrate the commencement of its first three graduates.

Professor Louis G. Carpenter

One of the early notable professors was Louis George Carpenter (March 28, 1861 – September 12, 1935) who was happy to be called "Professor Carp." He was a college professor and later the Dean of Engineering & Physics at Colorado State University formerly known as the Colorado Agricultural College. He was also an Engineer, Mathematician and an Irrigation and Consulting Engineer.

Carpenter began teaching mathematics at Michigan State Agricultural College and did so from 1883 to 1888.

Carpenter was recruited by President Charles Ingersoll and accepted the chair of the Engineering & Physics Department of the then Colorado Agricultural College. It was there where he began the first organized and systematic college program for irrigation engineering. Those completing such instruction were awarded a Bachelor of Science degree in Irrigation Engineering. In addition, Carpenter was a strong advocate to expand education opportunities to minorities and women. He helped promote and organize newly accredited degree programs despite opposition from those unwilling to change.

Carpenter declined the Presidency of that college (later university) in 1891 and several times during his tenure. Despite difficulty to enact change, he was significant in being able to help transform the farm focused college into a university of higher learning.

In 1889 he became the director of the Colorado Agricultural Experiment Station.

Carpenter was one of the foremost leading experts on irrigation systems. During his life he investigated irrigation systems not only in North America but also in Canada and Europe. This led to his engineering consulting and water law. He became Colorado's State Engineer which he held for several years while still teaching.

In 1911, Carpenter left academics and established an engineering consulting firm in Denver, Colorado. This covered not only included Irrigation Engineering but consulting on hydraulic construction projects and the problems associated with such projects. He did this traveling around Canada, the United States and Western Europe with his brother running the office until his retirement in 1922. He left many papers to the university and was given an honorary doctorate before his death in 1935.

Turn of the 20th century

Alston Ellis encountered limited funding and decided rapidly in 1895 to reduce the number of Experiment Stations. Female students grew in number from 44 in 1892 to 112 in 1896, and by fall 1895, the college's new domestic-economy program was in place. Football had a one-year stint at CAC in 1893, but Ellis was not a supporter of extracurricular activities and was especially hostile towards football.

Barton Aylesworth became the school's fourth president in 1899, and the combination of his non-confrontational style with the presence of the vocal Colorado Cattle and Horse Growers Association on the governing board allowed ranching and farming interests to take the college's agricultural programs to new heights, greatly influencing the development of the entire school. Initially, the influence of ranching interests brought tremendous progress to CAC's agricultural programs. Enrollment quadrupled, studies in veterinary medicine were re-established, and CAC's Experiment Station benefited from lobbying that finally secured state appropriations. Eventually, conflicts with agricultural interests may have prompted Aylesworth to begin promoting a more balanced curriculum at CAC, which he then fought hard to defend. The conflict also led him to tire and negotiate his resignation.

Aylesworth was a big supporter of extracurricular activities. Football returned to the college in fall 1899, but baseball was the school's most popular sport. In 1903, the women's basketball team won CAC's first unofficial athletic championship, culminating with a victory over the University of Colorado. New clubs, fraternities, and sororities also emerged. By 1905, the school had a fledgling music department, which two years later became the Conservatory of Music.

President Charles Lory 
Taking office in 1909, CAC President Charles Lory oversaw the school's maturation and reconciled longstanding conflicts between supporters of a broad or specialized curriculum. He embarked on a demanding schedule of personal appearances to make Colorado Agricultural College known as an institution that served the state's needs. Another of Lory's notable achievements was putting the school on solid fiscal ground, meeting rising construction costs and freeing the institution of debt.

The onset of World War I influenced all aspects of CAC, but nowhere was the impact more apparent than in the institution's programs for farmers. World War I created demands for American agricultural products, and CAC established new food production committees, information services and cultivation projects to help improve food production and conservation in Colorado. World War I also drew men from campus to Europe's battlefields. In June 1916, the National Defense Act created the Reserve Officers Training Corps. A few months later CAC applied to establish an ROTC unit in Fort Collins and resurrected a defunct National Guard unit on campus.

During the early 1930s, CAC's community-wide activities were greatly influenced by the Great Depression and the Dust Bowl. The Extension Service organized relief programs for inhabitants of Eastern Colorado, of whom a survey found 20,000 to be urgently in need of food, and helped sustain cropland threatened by pests and drought. President Lory sought to help Colorado farmers by pushing for major tax reforms to relieve them of high tax burdens, and played a significant role in a 1930s project that supplied irrigation water for agricultural development in Eastern Colorado.

Lory and the State Board had challenges of their own back on campus. In response to claims that the university was falling behind national standards, the board retired or demoted several senior professors and administrators deemed past the peak of their proficiency, and hired new doctorate-holding personnel while consolidating sections of lecture courses. A student petition led to the governing-board to change the college's name to more accurately reflect the diversity of its academic programs, and in 1935 the school became the Colorado State College of Agriculture and Mechanic Arts, or Colorado A&M for short. After 31 years of leadership, President Lory announced his retirement in 1938.

From World War II into the modern era
Soon after Pearl Harbor, Colorado A&M began to look like a military post, with the college serving as many as 1,500 servicemen. New President Roy Green tried to prepare for the sudden departure of students and arrival of servicemen by improving ROTC facilities, and introducing military-training programs. Although servicemen filed onto campus, student enrollment at Colorado A&M, 1,637 in fall 1942, dropped to 701 by fall 1943, and female students outnumbered their male counterparts for the first time. When the war ceased in 1945, soldiers returning from Europe and the Pacific filled U.S. higher-education institutions. Nearly 1,040 students attended the college in fall 1946, and about 1,600 students enrolled by spring 1946. Close to 80 former "Aggies" died in World War II including football talent Lewis "Dude" Dent.

Colorado A&M becomes a university under Bill Morgan
Colorado A&M shed its image as a narrow technical college and became a university in appearance and title during the 1950s under President Bill Morgan. Providing adequate student housing for an increasing number of youth approaching college age and improving cramped instructional facilities were among the first tests of Morgan's leadership. He responded, and five new residence halls were completed between 1953 and 1957.

Academic offerings grew to include advanced degrees. The State Board of Agriculture approved a doctoral degree in civil engineering in 1951, and three years later allowed other qualified departments to offer doctorates. Morgan believed students earning this advanced degree should hold it from a university, and so began a campaign to upgrade Colorado A&M to university status. In 1957, the Colorado General Assembly approved the new name of Colorado State University.

1960s: Student activism
Colorado State became a scene of intense student activism during the 1960s and early 1970s. The reduction of strict campus regulations for women was among the early targets of student activists, coming to the forefront in 1964 when a 21-year-old female student moved into unapproved off-campus housing to accommodate her late hours as editor of the student newspaper.

The civil-rights movement on campus also picked up momentum and visibility. In spring 1969, shortly before Morgan's retirement, Mexican-American and African-American student organizations presented a list of demands to university officials primarily urging increased recruitment of minority students and employees. The demonstrators' occupation of the Administration Building continued to the front lawn of Morgan's home. Students and university representatives took their concerns to state officials, but Colorado legislators rejected a subsequent university request for funds to support minority recruitment.

Anti-military protest took place in dramatic form at Colorado State from 1968 to 1970. On March 5, 1968, several hundred students and faculty with anti-war sentiments marched to Fort Collins' downtown War Memorial and wiped blood on a placard tied to the memorial. Hecklers and blockaders created such a disturbance that police had to disperse the non-marchers. In May 1970, as campus peace activists held the second day of a student strike in the gymnasium in response to the U.S. invasion of Cambodia and the student deaths at Kent State University, one or more arsonists set Old Main ablaze, destroying the 92-year-old cornerstone of Colorado State.

2000s: CSU under President Penley
In his welcoming address for the fall 2007 semester, former CSU President Larry Edward Penley called for CSU to set the standard for the 21st century public land-grant research university. He identified as the heart of this ideal the contribution to the prosperity and quality of life of the local and international community, in part through fostering relationships and collaborations with federal research partners, the business community and key industries. A part of this approach was Colorado State's Supercluster research model, designed to utilize interdisciplinary, issue-based research on pressing global issues in which the university has particular expertise and connect research results to the marketplace. Initial Superclusters in infectious disease and in cancer research were launched. As well, new residence halls were constructed according to national green building standards, and a sustainability advisory committee was charged to coordinate green activities at Colorado State.

While maintaining historic ties to local agriculture, administration officials also emphasized the desire to better connect with the local community. As such, CSU became party to UniverCity, a multi-organization initiative that links the school with city government, community and business associations to expand and synchronize working relationships. Another goal set by the university was to improve undergraduate education. Penley stated that essential tasks were access and graduation rates, particularly for qualified low-income and minority students, and an education international in scope suited to a global economy.

Penley resigned in 2008.

Later 2000s: After President Penley
While a statistics professor at CSU, Mary Meyer declared that a study of salaries by CSU created salary goals for women faculty that were "substantially smaller than for men". This led CSU to start studying pay equity in 2015, which in turn led later that year to a quarter of female full professors receiving higher pay.

Joyce E. McConnell became the first female president of CSU in 2019. On June 9, 2022, the CSU Board of Governors and President McConnell announced she would be leaving her position as of June 30, 2022. Former Provost Rick Miranda was chosen to serve in an interim role while a new president is identified. In December 2022, the CSU Board announced the appointment of Amy Parsons, once its vice president of operations, then executive vice chancellor, as its 16th president effective Feb. 1, 2023.

Campus

Colorado State University is located in Fort Collins, Colorado, a mid-size city of approximately 142,000 residents at the base of the Front Range of the southern Rocky Mountains. The university's  main campus is located in central Fort Collins, and includes a  veterinary teaching hospital. CSU is also home to a  Foothills Campus, a  agricultural campus, and the  Pingree Park mountain campus. CSU uses  for research centers and Colorado State Forest Service stations outside of Larimer County.

Main campus
At the heart of the CSU campus lies the Oval, an expansive green area  around, lined with 65 American Elm trees. Designed in 1909, the Oval remains a center of activity and a major landmark at CSU. The Administration Building, constructed in 1924, faces the Oval from the south end, while several academic and administrative buildings occupy its perimeter. The Music Building, once the university library, currently houses the Institute for Learning and Teaching, which provides academic and career counseling as well as other student-focused programs. The music department moved to the University Center for the Arts upon its opening in 2008.  At the northwest corner of the Oval is Ammons Hall, formerly the women's recreational center and now home to the University Welcome Center. Just to the east of Ammons stands Guggenheim Hall, which currently houses the Department of Manufacturing Technology and Construction Management. The building was constructed in 1910 as a gift from U.S. Senator Simon Guggenheim to promote the study of home economics, and was recently renovated according to green building standards. Rounding out the Oval are the Weber Building, the Statistics Building, the Occupational Therapy Building, and Laurel Hall.

Another campus focal point is the main plaza, around which can be found Lory Student Center and Morgan Library, as well as several academic buildings. The Lory Student Center, named for former CSU President Charles Lory, houses Student Media, numerous organization offices, Student Government, and spaces to eat, drink and study. The Morgan Library was originally constructed in 1965 and named for former CSU President William E. Morgan. Following the flood of '97, this facility went through an extensive improvement project that included an addition to the main building and a renovation of the existing structure, with works completed in 1998. Current holdings include more than 2 million books, bound journals, and government documents. Morgan Library also contains a 13,000 square-foot addition called the Study Cube that seats 80 additional patrons. With a university issued ID card, students and staff are able to access the Cube 24 hours a day, including during finals week. To accommodate, the Loan and Reserve desk checks out laptops and other accessories over night if checked out less than six hours prior to closing. 

 Colorado State University's oldest existing building is Spruce Hall, constructed in 1881. Originally a dormitory that played a vital role in the early growth of the school's student enrollment, Spruce now houses the Division of Continuing Education and the Office of Admissions. The newest academic building on campus is the Behavioral Science building, which was completed in summer 2010. Other recent projects include the 2006 Transit Center addition to the north end of Lory Student Center (certified LEED Gold), an expansion of the Student Recreation Center, and the new Computer Science Building, completed in 2008.

 In 2008 CSU also opened its University Center for the Arts, located in the old Fort Collins High School. CSU purchased this historic building in 1995 and has since converted it into a new home for its programs in music, dance, theatre and the visual arts. The three-phase building project included a 318-seat University Theatre, a 100-seat Studio Theatre, and the 24,000 square-foot Runyan Music Hall, an adaptable rehearsal and performance space created out of the old high school gymnasium. The center also houses the University Art Museum, the Avenir Museum of Design and Merchandising, a 285-seat organ recital hall, and the 200-seat University Dance Theatre.

The campus is served by Transfort bus service, including the MAX Bus Rapid Transit route that opened in 2014.

Veterinary hospital
The James L. Voss Veterinary Teaching Hospital was constructed in 1979 and houses 28 specialties under one roof, ranging from emergency to oncology. Located in the Veterinary Health Complex south of the main campus in Fort Collins, the hospital has 79 veterinarians on clinics, educating 280 third- and fourth-year veterinary students on clinical rotations. In fiscal 2019, the hospital logged nearly 47,000 cases.

Foothills Campus
The  Foothills Campus, located on northwest edge of Fort Collins, is home to the department of atmospheric sciences, as well as several research and outreach centers. The Centers for Disease Control and Prevention, Engineering Research Center, B.W. Pickett Equine Center, Cooperative Institute for Research in the Atmosphere (CIRA), the Colorado Division of Wildlife, and the Animal Reproduction Biotechnology Lab can all be found at the Foothills Campus.

Organization

Administration
Colorado State University is a public land-grant institution and Carnegie Doctoral/Research University Extensive. The Board of Governors presides over the Colorado State University System, including the flagship campus in Fort Collins together with Colorado State University–Pueblo and the CSU–Global Campus. The Board consists of nine voting members appointed by the Governor of Colorado and confirmed by the Colorado State Senate, and four elected non-voting members. Voting members are community leaders from many fields, including agriculture, business, and public service. A student and faculty representative from each university act as non-voting Board members.

The 14th president of Colorado State University was Anthony A. Frank. A 13-member Board of Governors oversees the Colorado State University System. Joe Zimlich, President and CEO of Bohemian Companies, serves as the current chairman of the Board of Governors.

At its December 2008 public meeting, the Board of Governors of the CSU System decided it was in the best interest of all CSU System campuses to separate what had previously been a conjoined position of CSU System chancellor and CSU Fort Collins president. On May 5, 2009, Joe Blake was named the finalist for the chancellor position.

Academics
Colorado State offers 150 programs of study across 8 colleges and 55 departments. In addition to its notable programs in biomedical sciences, engineering, environmental science, agriculture, and human health and nutrition, CSU offers professional programs in disciplines including business, journalism, and construction management as well as in the liberal and performing arts, humanities, and social sciences. CSU also offers bachelor's degrees, graduate degrees, certificates, and badges online.

Fall Freshman Statistics

Colorado State employs a total of 1,540 faculty members, with 1,000 on tenure-track appointments. The student:faculty ratio is 17:1. CSU awarded 6,090 degrees in 2009–2010, including 4,336 bachelor's degrees, 1,420 master's degrees, 203 doctoral degrees, and 131 Doctor in Veterinary Medicine degrees.

Academic colleges

College of Agricultural Sciences
In order to prepare students in land stewardship and natural resources, the College of Agricultural Sciences offers majors in traditional disciplines such as agronomy, animal science, and horticulture and Landscape Architecture, in addition to Organic Agriculture, Agricultural Biology, and Agribusiness degrees suited to contemporary developments. College facilities include greenhouses, farms, ranches, and an equine center. In conjunction with the School of Education, the College of Agricultural Sciences provides an interdisciplinary program that leads to a Bachelor of Science and a teaching license in Agricultural Education. The college offers master's degrees in Agricultural Education, Agricultural Extension Education, Integrated Resource Management, Pest Management, and the Peace Corps Masters International Program. The college faculty also mentor M.S. and Ph.D. students in Agricultural Biology (Entomology, Plant Pathology, and Weed Science), Agricultural and Resource Economics, Animal Sciences, Horticulture, and Soil and Crop Sciences  The college-sponsored Specialty Crops Program aims to help local growers master production systems, and explore marketing opportunities for their specialty crops. The faculty, staff, and students in the college conduct fundamental and applied research in agricultural sciences and also work in extension and engage with agricultural communities and businesses to implement new discoveries in food production and safety, in food and environmental sustainability, and in human well-being.

College of Health and Human Sciences
With programs in education, individual and family development, health, housing, or apparel/interior design and merchandising, studies in the College of Health and Human Sciences are human-centered, focused on social problems and quality of life issues. CHHS is one of the largest on campus with more than 4,000 undergraduate students and over 850 graduate students. Extension specialists, such as in the Department of Food Science and Human Nutrition, provide valuable health, nutrition, and food safety information to the public. The Human Performance Clinical Research Laboratory in the Department of Health and Exercise Science provides heart attack prevention evaluations to underserved populations, and the Center for Community Partnerships works with citizens with disabilities. The college also has a role in the new Colorado School of Public Health, to be jointly operated with UC Denver Health Sciences Center and the University of Northern Colorado.

College of Business
Colorado State University's College of Business offers a Bachelor of Science in Business Administration. Colorado State's on-campus Master of Business Administration (MBA) program offers several degrees. The Computer Information Systems (CIS) concentration within the Master of Science in Business Administration (MSBA) is one of the oldest CIS degrees in the country. The new Global and Sustainable Enterprise MSBA takes on environmental conservation, microfinance, public health, alternative energy and agriculture from a business perspective. Each student completes a summer of fieldwork, typically in a developing country. The Denver-based Executive MBA Program instructs professionals, emerging business leaders and mid-to-senior level managers. For over 40 years, CSU has also provided a well-regarded Distance MBA Program. The college was reaccredited by the Association to Advance Collegiate Schools of Business in Fall 2011.

History of the College of Business 
Business courses (accounting, shorthand, and typewriting) were first offered at Colorado A&M in 1944. The first formal business program (a two-year secretarial certificate) was offered in 1950. The bachelor's degree in business was first offered in 1956 and within two years the School of Business was formed and located in Johnson Hall. In 1966, the College of Business was established and located in the Clark building. The undergraduate programs at the College of Business gained AACSB accreditation in 1970, with the graduate programs earning accreditation in 1976. In 1995, the College of Business moved to its current home in Rockwell Hall and a couple years later a new Classroom and Technology Wing was added. The college's growth continued in 2005 with the approval of plans to expand Rockwell Hall and the addition of a Business minor to the college's offerings. Construction of Rockwell Hall West was completed in 2009, and the following year the college hosted General Colin L. Powell as keynote speaker to celebrate the grand opening of the addition. The College of Business was ranked in Top 10 for "Best Administered MBA Program" in 2012 and 2013 by the Princeton Review.

Walter Scott, Jr. College of Engineering
The Walter Scott, Jr. College of Engineering, originally the first engineering program in the state of Colorado, contains the departments of Atmospheric Science, Chemical and Biological Engineering, Biomedical Engineering, Civil and Environmental Engineering, Electrical and Computer Engineering, and Mechanical Engineering. A new degree concentration in International Engineering is available as a dual degree in the Liberal Arts and Engineering Science. College of Engineering students are engaged in international service projects through groups such as Engineers Without Borders.

In 2005, college faculty generated $50 million in research expenditures, exceeding an average of $500,000 per faculty member. In FY12, those funds grew to approximately $65.4 million and about $620,000 for each of the 105 faculty members dedicated for research expenditures . The college is home to four recognized Colorado State University Programs of Research and Scholarly Excellence: the Department of Atmospheric Science, the Center for Extreme Ultraviolet Science and Technology, the Engines and Energy Conversion Laboratory, and the Environmental and Water Resources Engineering Program.

The university's department of Mechanical Engineering was once the authority for the Motorsport Engineering Research Center. The research and development facility was located near the foothills campus of the school. The center houses the university's Formula SAE team, and is still home to past and present formula SAE competition open wheeled race cars, and the current EcoCAR2 team, developing a hydrogen propulsion Chevrolet Mablibu sedan. The Department of Mechanical Engineering also once offered a motorsports engineering concentration at the masters level. However, in recent years, lack of demand saw a phasing out, and the former research campus was converted to the "Factory" where CSU Mechanical engineering researchers look into advanced applications of composites like carbon fiber. Some of this research still applies to motorsport engineering, but the facility is no longer dedicated solely to motorsport research. Renowned materials engineering professor Dr. Donald W. Radford coordinates the CSU Factory campus, which has major connections to Boeing. It is a site of many automotive innovations, such as research of advanced plastics for modern exhaust manifolds. The Boeing aeronautical corporation also has major sponsorship of nacelle aerodynamic designs, directed by Dr. Steven Guzik.

Along with the Factory of the Foothills Campus, the Department of Mechanical Engineering also facilitates the Powerhouse Energy Institute. At this lab, massive internal combustion generators are investigated and made more efficient. The lab is also home to a CSU company developing Biofuel derived of algae. laser ignition Spark Plugs and Clean burning cookstoves are examples to technologies developed from this lab. The lab is the largest in the nation of any academic engines research lab, and works with clients including Woodward Inc, Caterpillar, John Deere, and VanDyne AMG superturbo.

The university's College of Engineering also houses the NSF EUV ERC, or the Engineering Research Center. This facility has connections to UC Berkeley and CU Boulder, and researches Extreme Ultraviolets. The building is home to the world's largest wave hydraulic simulator, and an earthquake shake table for half scale buildings. Nearby one can find the CIRA, or Cooperative Institute for Research in the Atmosphere, in connections with NOAA. Other advanced labs include the CHILL radar facility and a research lab in equine sciences. The center is also home to the Ion Propulsion and plasma Space engineering lab under direction of Dr. John Williams (former JPL Ion group engineer), which develops ion propulsion rocket thrusters to advance planetary spacecraft.

In August 2013, Colorado State University opened a new state of the art 122,000 biomedical engineering building for academic and research purposes. Examples of research in the new facility include nanoscale single molecule biophysics, biofuel production and environmental pollutants, biomaterials and medical devices, nanoscale biosensors and drug therapy. Other recent research by joint graduate students and professors include Graphene production in biocatalyst oxidation reaction chambers, and methane emissions studies. Being reputable for advanced research in biological and veterinary science, CSU is heavily involved in biological-mechanical engineering applications, and large scale fab production of carbon graphite could help advance computer chips over Silicon limitations and also the potential of Space elevators.

Additionally, the college has completed construction on the Advanced Beam Laboratory, beside the NSF ERC. the Advanced beam lab houses both a short-pulse, high-peak-power laser system and a linear particle accelerator for researching and advancing particle acceleration technologies, as well as advanced laser technology. The particle accelerator relates to the department of physics, which houses an on-campus quantum computing lab, and is interested in dark matter and big bang origins.

The college of engineering is highly selective, more so than the university as a whole. Mechanical engineering Master's candidates are considered past a 3.0 undergraduate GPA. In the years following 2016, the college of engineering saw major changes to some curriculum. In mechanical engineering, Dr. John Petro took over lectures and learning of senior design practicum to transition mechanical engineering students into practicing engineers. Due to previous logistics issues and feedback from graduate students in the EcoCAR three practicum, Dr. Petro and these students helped the department implement the required extensive learning of Lean manufacturing, the Toyota production system and its subsidiary quality principles of Kaizen, Muda elimination, Jidoka, Poka Yoke, 6S and six-sigma practices. These philosophies were now required to be explained by all senior design teams to graduate. This learning of the Toyota way coupled with the house of quality in sophomore design and statistics for seniors is an emulation of the curriculum set by the Massachusetts Institute of Technology. Similarly, some engineering departments have implemented Economics courses, and the electrical and computer engineering department was among the first in the world to attempt a revolutionary new curriculum layout to help retain more students.

College of Liberal Arts
The college was established in 1951 and underwent multiple name changes over time. In 1934 it was called The Division of Science and Arts. In 1968, the arts and sciences colleges split, and became the College of Humanities and Social Sciences. In 1977 the college was renamed to the College of Arts, Humanities, and Social Sciences. Finally, in 1992, it was named the College of Liberal Arts.

Liberal Arts is the largest college at Colorado State, with 17 departments (19 majors, 35 minors, 54 concentrations, 23 Graduate & PhD Programs). In total, CLA houses over 6400 Undergraduate Students, over 500 Graduate students, +300 faculty members, and have an estimated alumni population of over 50,000 former students. The departments include: Anthropology and Geography,
Art & Art History, Communication Studies, Economics, English, Ethnic Studies, History, Interdisciplinary Liberal Arts, International Studies, Journalism & Media Communication, Languages, Literatures & Cultures, Arts Management, Philosophy, Political Science, School of Music, Theatre & Dance, Sociology, and Women’s and Gender Studies.

Warner College of Natural Resources
The origins of the Warner College of Natural Resources can be traced to CSU's first forestry course in 1904. Over the following 100 years the college has grown to become a comprehensive natural resources college, and contains the academic departments of Human Dimensions of Natural Resources; Geosciences; Fish, Wildlife and Conservation Biology; Forest and Rangeland Stewardship; and Ecosystem Science and Sustainability. Research areas include forest sciences, fisheries, wildlife and conservation biology, geology, geophysics, hydrogeology, geomorphology, ecosystem science, rangeland ecology, recreation and tourism, watershed management, and environmental sciences.

The college has also traditionally been highly involved in supporting the agricultural and natural resources community. The Colorado Natural Heritage Program (CNHP) tracks Colorado's rare and imperiled species and habitats, and Colorado Water Knowledge provides water information of all kinds. The Environmental Learning Center, located three miles (5 km) east of campus on the Poudre River, hosts CSU research projects and educational programs. The Western Center for Integrated Resource Management works on sustainability and profitability with graduate students and local farmers. The college provides broad technical assistance, training, and research opportunities for protected area managers and students in Africa, Latin America, Asia, and the United States.

College of Natural Sciences
The College of Natural Sciences had the third highest enrollment of all colleges on CSU's campus with 3,684 students and the third largest undergraduate major, psychology. One quarter of participants in the CSU Honors Program are in Natural Sciences, and the college provides undergraduate students the opportunity to participate in a Living Learning Community located in Laurel Village. Graduate and undergraduate students complete their coursework in the departments of Biochemistry, Biology, Chemistry, Computer Science, Mathematics, Physics, Psychology, Statistics, Zoology, and the Center for Science Math and Technology Education. Interdisciplinary degree programs cover Cellular and Molecular Biology, Ecology, Neuroscience, and Biomedical Engineering.

College of Veterinary Medicine and Biomedical Sciences
The College of Veterinary Medicine and Biomedical Sciences is home to the No. 3 ranked veterinary medicine program in the nation, according to U.S. News & World Report. The program is an integral part of the four departments that, along with the James L. Voss Veterinary Medical Center and the Veterinary Diagnostic Laboratory, comprise the college. Two faculty members are members of the National Academy of Sciences, five faculty members are University Distinguished Professors, and one faculty member is a University Distinguished Teaching Scholar. Undergraduate programs are offered in Biomedical Sciences and Neuroscience. The Undergraduate Biomedical Sciences program has three concentrations: Anatomy and Physiology, Environmental Health, and Microbiology. The college houses a variety of graduate programs at both the M.S. and PhD levels, many of which also require the doctor of veterinary medicine degree. Interdisciplinary programs explore biotechnology, neuroscience, resource and livestock management.

The College of Veterinary Medicine and Biomedical Sciences at Colorado State University has the largest research program of any college of veterinary medicine in the world. Research facilities and programs include the Robert H. and Mary G. Flint Animal Cancer Center, and the Equine Orthopedic Research Center. The Environmental Health Advanced Systems Laboratory researches the use of computer-based technology in environmental health studies. Over the last 10 years, The EHASL has worked with the US Environmental Protection Agency, National Cancer Institute, and Centers for Disease Control. In 1977, the college's dean, William Tietz, was appointed President of Montana State University. In 2012, the College of Veterinary Medicine and Biomedical Sciences obtained a new dean, Dr. Mark Stetter. Dr. Stetter left the University in October 2021.

Institutes and centers
Cooperative Institute for Research in the Atmosphere (CIRA)
Information Science & Technology Center at Colorado State University (ISTeC)
Energy Institute
Public Lands History Center – In 2007 a group of CSU History and Anthropology faculty and research associates created the Center for Public History and Archaeology with the dual goal of providing practical and meaningful work experiences for graduate students and helpful collaborative projects for public agencies such as the National Park Service.  In 2010 the name was changed to Public Lands History Center to better describe its focus and collaborative mission.  The center's mission is to "foster the production of historical knowledge through collaborative engagement with institutions responsible for the sustainable stewardship of protected areas, water, and other critical resources." The center's Director is one of its founders, CSU Professor of History and noted environmental historian Mark Fiege.

Rankings

Princeton Review: The Review named CSU's MBA program as one of the 10 best administered programs nationwide in 2007, and 2012–2015.

Business Week: Included CSU's undergraduate business program among the best in the country in 2011, ranked at No. 89 In 2014 the College of Business moved up in the ranks to be ranked 73rd (an increase of 16 places from the previous year) in Bloomberg Business Week's Undergraduate rankings.

Notable areas of research
Historically, CSU faculty were at the forefront of radiation treatment for cancer, environmental and animal ethics, and weather forecasting. A 1961 feasibility study at CSU was crucial for the establishment of the Peace Corps.

Research in the Engines and Energy Conversion Laboratory has created a technological solution to limit pollutants from single-stroke engines, and is now in widespread use in the Philippines. The Center for Disaster and Risk Analysis is dedicated to reducing the harm and losses caused by natural, technological, and human-caused disasters. Projects have looked at Muslim-Americans after September 11, Hurricane Katrina, the 2010 BP Oil Spill, and childcare disaster planning.

Outlying campuses cater to a range of research activities including crops research, animal reproduction, public health and watershed management. The Colorado Agricultural Experiment Station (CAES) was established in 1888 in accordance with provisions of the Hatch Act of 1887, calling for experiment stations at land-grant universities. State and federal funds support CAES research programs. In 2007, research activities included pest management, food safety and nutrition, environmental quality, plant and animal production systems, and community and rural development. The NSF Engineering Research Center for Extreme Ultra Violet Science and Technology, funded by the National Science Foundation, partners industry with Colorado State University, CU-Boulder, and the University of California-Berkeley. The Colorado Center for Biorefining and Biofuels (C2B2) is the first research center created under the umbrella of the new Colorado Renewable Energy Collaboratory, involving CSU, CU, Colorado School of Mines, and the National Renewable Energy Laboratory. The center develops biofuels and bio-refining technologies. Colorado State's research Supercluster model brings together researchers across disciplines to work on topics of global concern in which CSU has a demonstrated expertise. Research results are connected to the marketplace through transfer, patenting and licensing activities carried out by experts with a focus on each research area.

CSU also has a well established research program in infectious disease. The Regional Biocontainment Laboratory, funded by the National Institutes of Health, is home to scientists developing vaccines and drugs for some world's most devastating diseases. The Biocontainment Laboratory also houses one of 10 US Regional Centers of Excellence for Biodefense and Emerging Infectious Diseases, funded by a $40 million grant from the National Institute of Allergy and Infectious Diseases. Much of the Cancer Supercluster, which involves the collaboration of five colleges, is based around the work of the university's Animal Cancer Center, the largest center of its kind in the world.

International programs
Approximately 950 students per year participate in educational programs abroad, and nearly 1,300 foreign students and scholars from more than 85 countries are engaged in academic work and research on campus. The initial pilot studies for the Peace Corps were conducted by Colorado State faculty, and the university is consistently one of the top-ranking institutions in the nation for the recruitment of Peace Corps volunteers. Since 1988, CSU and the Peace Corps have participated in four cooperative master's degree programs in English, Food Science and Human Nutrition, Natural Resources, and Agriculture. The program involves at least 2 semesters of course work at CSU combined with time abroad as a Peace Corps volunteer. Colorado State offers various programs on campus for students interested in international issues. Regional specializations with core courses and electives are available in Asian Studies, Middle East/North Africa Studies, Latin American and Caribbean Studies, or Russian, Eastern and Central Europe Studies. The Global Village Living Learning Community is a housing option for students with international interests.

Honors Program
The Honors Program provides challenging and enriching programs for high achieving students in all majors through two academic tracks. One track is designed for students aiming to complete their general education requirements within the Honors Program, and a second is composed of upper division courses, usually appropriate for currently enrolled or transfer students. The Academic Village, which opened in fall 2007, offers 180 Honor students the opportunity to live in the Honors Living Learning Community. 1,126 students participated in the Honors Program in fall 2007.

Athletics 

Colorado State University competes in 17 sponsored intercollegiate sports, including 11 for women (cross country, indoor track, outdoor track, volleyball, basketball, golf, tennis, swimming, softball, soccer and water polo) and six for men (football, cross country, indoor track, outdoor track, basketball, and golf). Colorado State's athletic teams compete along with 8 other institutions in the Mountain West Conference (MW), which is an NCAA Division I conference and sponsors Division I FBS football. The Conference was formed in 1999, splitting from the former 16-member Western Athletic Conference. CSU has won 9 MW tournament championships and won or shared 11 regular season titles. Rams football teams won or shared the Mountain West title in 1999, 2000 and 2002.

On December 13, 2011, Jim McElwain was introduced as the head football coach at Colorado State. McElwain had worked as the Alabama offensive coordinator from 2008 to 2011. On December 4, 2014, Jim McElwain accepted the head coach position at the University of Florida. This was the first time a Colorado State Rams head coach left the team for another program.

 On December 5, 2014, the Colorado State University System Board of Governors gave approval to build Colorado State Stadium, a multi-use stadium on campus to replace Hughes Stadium, built several miles from campus in the 1960s.

Mascots 

Over the years Colorado State University has displayed several mascots. In 1919, the school was represented by a black bear cub. The bear cub was later replaced by Peanuts the Bulldog. Peanuts was owned by a student and would roam around campus, where he was fed peanuts by the student body. Peanuts was poisoned by students of the University of Colorado Boulder and died in 1918. After Peanuts' death, Glenn Morris, an alum of Colorado State University donated another bulldog named Gallant Defender to the university. The first ram to become the mascot of Colorado State University was Buck, introduced in 1946. Colorado State University's mascot remains the ram to this day. It was during a basketball game half time contest that CAM the Ram became the name of the beloved mascot.

Student life

There are opportunities for students to be active, with bike trails and hiking nearby. In 2006, Money ranked Fort Collins as the "Best Place to Live" in the United States.

Clubs and activities
There are over 450 student organizations including 34 honor societies at CSU. 60% of undergraduates participate in intramural sports while 10% join one of 19 fraternities and 14 sororities. There are 30 sport clubs, including cycling, baseball, water polo, triathlon, wrestling, and rugby. 300 music, theatre and dance performances, exhibitions, and other arts events take place on campus each year. The student government is the Associated Students of Colorado State University. CSU's daily newspaper is the Rocky Mountain Collegian. CSU also has a student-run campus television station and a student radio station, KCSU FM.

Sport clubs
Sport Clubs at Colorado State University were established in 1978. They are run and funded by student fees and team fundraisers and compete with other colleges and universities but not at the NCAA level. There are currently 30 Sport Club teams. Every year the clubs take a combined 150 trips. There are over 1,000 students associated with the program. Last year 23 of these teams competed at regional and national championships. The programs have enjoyed a significant amount of recent success with National Championships in: Men's Ice Hockey (1995)
Women's Lacrosse (2008, 2010, 2011, 2013); Baseball (2004–2010);
Men's Lacrosse (1999, 2001, 2003, 2006, 2012).

The sports for which there are clubs at Colorado State University include: Alpine Skiing, Baseball, Bowling, Crew, Cycling, Field Hockey, Horse Polo (Men's and Women's), Ice Hockey (Men's and Women's), In-Line Hockey, Lacrosse (Men's and Women's), Logging Sports, Rodeo (Men's and Women's), Rugby (Men's and Women's), Shotgun Sports (Men's and Women's), Snowboard, Soccer (Men's and Women's), Swimming, Synchronized Ice Skating, Triathlon (Coed), Ultimate Frisbee Summer League, Ultimate Frisbee (Men's and Women's), Volleyball, Water Polo (Men's and Women's), and Wrestling (Men's and Women's)

Student media
The Rocky Mountain Collegian is CSU's student-run daily newspaper. The paper has a fully functional website and a mobile application, and students have complete control over editorial decisions. The paper was founded in 1891, and was a weekly publication by the 1930s. During the 1940s and 1950s, the paper earned disrepute in the local community for its unpopular support of women's rights and anti-racism stance. By the 1970s, the Collegian was consistently publishing daily. Editorial quality and financial support have varied over the years, at times rising among elite college newspapers and at others struggling to publish. During the 1990s, the paper was twice selected as one of the top 12 daily student papers in the country. In late 2007, the Collegian published a staff article that incited national debate about free speech. The article read, in its entirety, "Taser This...Fuck Bush." This event, as well as President Penley's considerations of "partnering" out the Collegian by Gannett in January 2008, lead to proposals in making CSU's student media, including the Rocky Mountain Collegian, a not-for-profit organization independent from the university. This resulted in the entirety of CSU Student Media to separate from the university to operate under an independent company, the Rocky Mountain Student Media Corporation.

KCSU is Colorado State's student run station, with a format focusing on alternative and college rock music, including indie rock, punk, hip-hop and electronic music. News, sports and weather updates along with talk programs and specialty shows round out the programming schedule. Broadcasting at 10,000 watts, KCSU is among the larger college stations in the country, reaching approximately 250,000 listeners.
KCSU first began broadcasting in 1964 as a station owned, operated and financed by students. Following a long period as a professional station, KCSU again became student run in 1995, at which time the current format was adopted. As with the Collegian and CTV, KCSU was hit hard by the 1997 flood, and for a time was forced to broadcast from remote locations. Now back in its original Lory Student Center location, KCSU has benefited from revamped production facilities and updated equipment.

CTV is CSU's student-run television station, that allows students to hone their media skills- reporting, writing, producing, shooting, editing- in an educational environment. The station is a winner of fourteen Rocky Mountain Collegiate Media Association awards and a Student Emmy Award from the National Academy of Television Arts and Sciences Heartland Chapter. Content includes news shows on Tuesdays and Wednesdays, a sports show on Mondays, and an entertainment show Thursdays. CTV was founded in 1989, and currently broadcasts weeknights on the university cable station (Comcast channel 11) at 8 pm, with reruns at 9 am and 12 noon the next day.

Student-run magazine College Avenue was founded in 2005 with the goal, as put forth by its founding editors, of giving students a new forum to address controversial issues affecting the campus community from their own vantage point. Since its first issue in fall 2005, the magazine is released quarterly.

Greek life
Greek life at Colorado State began in the fall of 1915. Currently 10% of undergraduates join one of CSUs 19 fraternities and 14 sororities. The CSU Inter-Fraternity Council acts as the governing body for the 19 fraternities, each with a delegate representative. Similarly, the CSU Panhellenic Council governs the sororities. CSU Greek organizations are involved in a number of philanthropic activities around campus, among them CSUnity, Cans around the Oval, Habitat for Humanity and RamRide. The governing bodies recently raised $25,000 towards the sponsorship of a Habitat for Humanity home.

From 1932 until 1949, Colorado State University was home to the Eta chapter of Phrateres, a philanthropic-social organization for female college students. Eta was the seventh chapter installed and Phrateres eventually had over 20 chapters in Canada and the United States. (The chapter name "Eta" was reused for the chapter installed at Arizona State University in 1958.)

Residence halls
13 residence halls provide on-campus living for over 5,000 students. First-year students are required to live in one of the halls on campus, and upperclassman and graduate living is offered in the university-owned Aggie Village, which has space for 973 individuals. The halls also have a number of Living-Learning communities that directly link the on-campus living environment with a specific academic focus in Honors, engineering, natural sciences, health and wellness, equine sciences, leadership development, or pre-veterinary medicine. The Key Academic and Key Service Communities creates an academically focused residential community for freshmen who share a desire for academic achievement, active involvement in classes, community service, campus activities, and appreciation of diversity. Residents share classes and take advantage of yearlong service opportunities with a close knit group of 19 other students.

CSU Honors Program participants have the opportunity to live in the Honors Living Community. Academic Village, which opened in fall 2007, houses Living Learning Communities for 180 Honors and 240 Engineering students. Students in the College of Natural Sciences can choose to live in Laurel Village, which opened in fall 2014.

University apartments
Students, faculty, and staff may choose to live in the university apartments. Colorado State University University Housing oversees University Village, International House, Aggie Village Family, and Aggie Village. Known as a "global community" Apartment Life's mission to diversity shows in the fact that approximately 60 percent of residents and staff are from 80 different nations. Residents of CSU and Fort Collins community members enjoy a diverse amount of enrichment programs offered through the University Housing staff.

Student demographics
In fall 2007, CSU opened its doors to 24,983 students, among them 20,765 undergraduates, 2,332 master's students, 1,347 doctoral students, and 539 professional students in the College of Biomedical and Veterinary Medicine. 80% of undergraduates are Colorado residents, and within the student population 50 states and 79 countries are represented. 52% of undergraduates are women, 13.2% of undergraduates are ethnic minorities (excluding international students), and 3% of undergraduates are 30 and over. Of minority students, 48% are Hispanic, 24% Asian American, 16% African American, and 12% Native American. Over the past ten years, minority enrollment has increased 35%, from 2,361 to 3,178, an increase from 10.9% to 13.2% of the student population. Though progress has been made, increasing minority enrollment at CSU has been a challenge for school administrators, one made yet more difficult by high dropout rates in many Colorado high schools with concentrated minority populations.

Notable alumni
CSU has 169,935 living alumni with 50 active alumni chapters (14 in Colorado and 37 out of state) and 9 national interest groups. CSU graduates include Pulitzer Prize winners, astronauts, CEOs, and two former governors of Colorado.

Academia and science
Alicia Bertone, ENGIE-Axium Endowed Dean's Chair of the Graduate School at the Ohio State University
Paul Broadie, president of Housatonic Community College and Gateway Community College
Mary L. Cleave, astronaut
Martin J. Fettman, astronaut
James Van Hoften, astronaut
John Gill, mathematician and father of modern bouldering
Edward Harwood, Aeroponics Inventor
George Marsaglia, computer scientist
Mark Mattson, neuroscientist
Jürgen Mulert, economist, Fulbright scholar, founder of the German Fulbright Alumni Association
J. Wayne Reitz, fifth president of the University of Florida (1955–1967)
Kent Rominger, 1978, Former NASA astronaut and shuttle commander
Jon Rubinstein, American computer scientist, helped create the iPod
George E. Staples, veterinary researcher and animal nutrition pioneer

Arts and performance
John Amos, actor
Nicole Anona Banowetz, American artist and sculptor
Baxter Black, cowboy poet
Keith Carradine, Academy Award-winning actor
Dominique Dunne, actress
Garry Gross, American fashion photographer known for his dog portraiture and work with model and actress Brooke Shields
Katherine Indermaur, poet and author
Michael Johnson, country and folk singer-songwriter
Leslie Jones, actress and comedian
Yusef Komunyakaa, MA, 1981, Pulitzer Prize-winning poet
Willow Patterson, drag queen and winner of RuPaul’s Drag Race season 14
Susan Lowdermilk, artist, printmaker
Isaac Slade, professional musician and lead singer of The Fray
Derek Theler, actor in Baby Daddy
Harlan Thomas prominent Seattle architect
 James Stobie aka Stobe the Hobo - Famous YouTuber

Athletics

David Anderson, professional football player
Al "Bubba" Baker, professional football player
Shaquil Barrett, professional football player
Randy Beverly, professional football player
Kapri Bibbs, professional football player
Sam Brunelli, professional football player
Susan Butcher, dogsled racer
Jack Christiansen, Detroit Lions (1951–1958), member Pro football Hall of Fame
David Cohn (born 1995), American-Israeli basketball player in the Israel Basketball Premier League
Jim David, Detroit Lions (1952–1959)
Steve Fairchild, former NFL offensive coordinator, former Colorado State University football head coach.
Sherwood Fries, professional football player
Donovan Gans, professional football player
Clark Haggans, professional football player, member of 2006 Super Bowl champion Pittsburgh Steelers
Becky Hammon, Las Vegas Aces coach
Caleb Hanie, professional football player
John Howell, professional football player
Colton Iverson (born 1989), basketball player for Maccabi Tel Aviv of the Israeli Basketball Premier League
Selwyn Jones, professional football player
Brady Keys, professional football player and businessman
Stanton Kidd (born 1992), basketball player for Hapoel Jerusalem in  the Israeli Basketball Premier League
Mark Knudson, former Major League Baseball Pitcher
Martin Laird, PGA Tour golfer and 5-time winner
Keith Lee, NFL player
Kim Lyons, an athlete and personal trainer on The Biggest Loser
Lawrence McCutcheon, NFL Player: L.A. Rams, Denver Broncos, Seattle Seahawks, & Buffalo Bills
Kevin McDougal, NFL player
Thurman "Fum" McGraw, Hall of Fame Football Player
Keli McGregor, President of the Colorado Rockies and professional football player
Kevin McLain, professional football player
Scooter Molander, American football player
Glenn Morris, 1935, Gold medal winner in the 1936 Olympics in Berlin
Mike Montgomery, professional basketball coach
Sean Moran, professional football player
Clint Oldenburg, professional football player
Milt Palacio, professional basketball player
Erik Pears, professional football player
Joey Porter, professional football player, member of 2006 Super Bowl champion Pittsburgh Steelers
Bill Quayle, athletics director for Emporia State University from 1979 to 1999.
Bob Rule, NBA All-Star
Bailey Santistevan, legendary coach featured in the July 5, 1999, edition of Sports Illustrated.
Brady Smith, professional football player
Jason Smith, professional basketball player
Andre Strode, professional football player
Pete Thomas, professional football player
Amy Van Dyken, Olympic swimmer and gold medalist
Garrett Grayson, professional football player
Ty Sambrailo, professional football player
Crockett Gillmore, professional football player
Bradlee Van Pelt, professional football player

Politics
Wayne Allard, United States Senator from Colorado (1997–2009)
Ibrahim Abdulaziz Al-Assaf, Finance Minister – Saudi Arabia
Anwar al-Awlaki, Yemeni-American imam and reputed Al-Qaeda terrorist. The first American citizen to be targeted and killed by a U.S. drone strike
Benny Begin, PhD in geology, Israeli politician, Knesset member and minister.
Greg Brophy, Republican member of the Colorado Senate
Les Eaves (Business Management), Republican member of the Arkansas House of Representatives for White County
John Ensign, former United States Senator from Nevada
Cory Gardner, Republican U.S. Senator from Colorado
Basuki Hadimuljono, Indonesian Minister of Public Works and Public Housing
Jim Hawkes, (PhD in psychology, 1970), Canadian politician
Paula Hicks-Hudson, lawyer, Toledo, Ohio City Council President and acting Mayor
Doug Hutchinson, former mayor of the city of Fort Collins, Colorado
Conway LeBleu, attended late 1940s, did not graduate, native of Lake Charles, Louisiana, represented Calcasieu and Cameron parishes in the Louisiana House of Representatives from 1964 to 1988
Marilyn Musgrave, former Republican member of the United States House of Representatives
Angie Paccione, politician
Bill Ritter, governor of Colorado, former Denver District Attorney
Stan Matsunaka, politician
Roy R. Romer, former Colorado governor
Brian Schweitzer, 23rd Governor of Montana
Carol Voisin, ethics professor and former candidate for Congress
Dwight A. York, politician

Business
Walter Scott, Jr., Former CEO Peter Kiewit Sons' Incorporated, Level 3 Communications & Berkshire Hathaway Chairman

Military and intelligence agencies
William E. Adams, former Major in the United States Army and recipient of the Medal of Honor
James H. Dickinson, Commander, United States Space Command.
Salvatore Augustine Giunta, former Staff Sergeant in the United States Army and recipient of the Medal of Honor
Barbara Robbins, the first female CIA employee to die in action in the agency's history
Lew Walt, decorated U.S. Marine

Motorsports
Jim Malloy, American racecar driver

Notable faculty
 Maurice Albertson, civil engineer, Peace Corps co-founder
 Theodosia Grace Ammons, president, Colorado Equal Suffrage Association
 Raj Chandra Bose, statistician
 Louis George Carpenter, First Dean of Engineering & Physics, renown Irrigation Engineer 
 Henry P. Caulfield, Jr., political science
 Elnora M. Gilfoyle, Dean of the College of Applied Human Sciences (1989–1991), Provost/Academic Vice President (1991–1995)
 William M. Gray, atmospheric science
 Temple Grandin, animal sciences
 Rachel Justine Pries, mathematician, Fellow of the American Mathematical Society
 Thomas Sutherland, former hostage in Lebanon
 Holmes Rolston III, father of environmental ethics
 Bernard Rollin, animal ethics advocate
 Ronald M. Sega, Systems Engineering 
 Jamuna Sharan Singh, ecologist, faculty (1971–74, 1981–82 and 1993–94), Shanti Swarup Bhatnagar Prize recipient
 Bryan Willson, Mechanical Engineering
 Howard Ensign Evans, noted entomologist

See also

 List of forestry universities and colleges

Notes

References

Further reading

 Hansen II, J. E. (1977). Democracy's College in the Centennial State: A History of Colorado State University. Salt Lake City, Utah: Publisher's Press.
 Hansen II, J. E. (2007). Democracy's University: A History of Colorado State University, 1970–2003. Canada.

External links

 
 Colorado State Athletics website
 

 
CSU 01
Land-grant universities and colleges
Buildings and structures in Fort Collins, Colorado
Education in Fort Collins, Colorado
Schools in Larimer County, Colorado
Veterinary schools in the United States
Educational institutions established in 1870
1870 establishments in Colorado Territory
Tourist attractions in Larimer County, Colorado